The 2001 Davis Cup World Group Qualifying Round was held from 21 September to 14 October. They were the main play-offs of the 2001 Davis Cup. The winners of the playoffs advanced to the 2002 Davis Cup World Group, and the losers were relegated to their respective Zonal Regions I.

Teams
Bold indicates team had qualified for the 2001 Davis Cup World Group.

From World Group

 
 
 
 
 
 
 
 

 From Americas Group I

 
 

 From Asia/Oceania Group I

 
 

 From Europe/Africa Group I

Results summary
Date: 21–23 September; 12–14 October

The eight losing teams in the World Group first round ties and eight winners of the Zonal Group I final round ties competed in the World Group Qualifying Round for spots in the 2002 World Group.

Playoff results

Argentina vs. Belarus

Belgium vs. Morocco

Czech Republic vs. Romania

Ecuador vs. Great Britain

Italy vs. Croatia

Slovakia vs. Chile

Spain vs. Uzbekistan

United States vs. India

References

External links
Davis Cup official website

World Group Qualifying Round